Gonia (Greek: Γωνιά) is a village in the Rethymno regional unit in Crete, Greece, lying at an altitude of ca 222 m amsl, about 10 km southwest of the town of Rethymno. Gonia was the seat of the former municipality Nikiforos Fokas.

References

Populated places in Rethymno (regional unit)